Say It All with Iffat Omer is a Pakistani web television talk show hosted by Iffat Omer that first aired on 12 August 2019 on YouTube. The series is created by Najam Sethi and is produced by Meeran Karim. Each episode is separately sponsored and features a Pakistani celebrity interviewed about their daily life styles and success stories.

Production 
On being asked about what she felt will be new on her series, actress Iffat Omer told The Nation that she hopes to provide a safe platform for all celebrities. It will be covering various subjects including personal, cultural, local and global information.

Episodes

References 

2019 Pakistani television series debuts
Pakistani web series